Facundo Nicolás Cambeses (born 9 April 1997) is an Argentine professional footballer who plays as a goalkeeper for Banfield.

Club career
Cambeses started his career with Banfield. He didn't make his professional bow for the Primera División club until 2019, having been an unused substitute twenty-two times in all competitions across the previous three years. With first-choice Iván Arboleda away on international duty, Cambeses' senior debut arrived under Hernán Crespo on 18 March 2019 during a league fixture with Godoy Cruz at the Estadio Florencio Sola. In August 2020, Cambeses was loaned to Huracán.

International career
Cambeses represented Argentina at the 2017 South American U-20 Championship, winning three caps as they finished fourth in Ecuador. In 2016, he participated in the L'Alcúdia International Tournament in Spain. Three years after, Cambeses made the U23s' squad for the 2019 Pan American Games in Peru. He appeared in all five of their matches, including in the final versus Honduras, as Argentina won the trophy.

Career statistics
.

Honours
Argentina U23
Pan American Games: 2019
Pre-Olympic Tournament: 2020

References

External links

1997 births
Living people
Sportspeople from Buenos Aires Province
Argentine footballers
Argentina youth international footballers
Argentina under-20 international footballers
Footballers at the 2019 Pan American Games
Pan American Games gold medalists for Argentina
Pan American Games medalists in football
Association football goalkeepers
Argentine Primera División players
Club Atlético Banfield footballers
Club Atlético Huracán footballers
Medalists at the 2019 Pan American Games